The Kuringgai (Ku-ring-gai, Guringai) is a name applied (possibly erroneously) to a group consisting of several diverse indigenous Australian people. Things named after this group include:
Electoral district of Ku-ring-gai
Hornsby Ku-ring-gai Hospital
Ku-ring-gai Chase National Park
Ku-ring-gai Creative Arts High School
Ku-ring-gai Council
Mount Ku-ring-gai, New South Wales
SS Kuring-gai a former steam ferry on the Sydney to Manly run